Thomas Patrick Dunn (March 15, 1900 – January 20, 1976) was a professional baseball umpire who worked in the National League from 1939 to 1946. Dunn umpired 1146 regular season Major League Baseball (MLB) games in his 8-year career. He also umpired in the 1944 World Series and the 1943 All-Star Game.

MLB debut
The first major league game that Dunn umpired – between Boston and Brooklyn on June 27, 1939 – lasted 23 innings, one of the longest games in MLB history. It was declared a 2–2 tie, after 5 hours and 15 minutes.

See also

 List of Major League Baseball umpires

References

External links

1900 births
1976 deaths
Baseball people from Massachusetts
Major League Baseball umpires
People from Athol, Massachusetts
Sportspeople from Worcester County, Massachusetts